Fullwood is a surname. Notable people with the surname include:

People
Albert Henry Fullwood (1863–1930), Australian official war artist in the First World War
Bill Fullwood (1910–2005), Australian artist
Brent Fullwood (b. 1963), American football player
Bryce Fullwood (b. 1998), Australian racing driver
Francis Fullwood (died 1693), Archdeacon of Totnes
Harold Fullwood (1920–1993), city judge, St. Louis, Missouri
James Fullwood (1911–1981), English footballer
Reggie Fullwood (1975), Democratic member of the Florida House of Representatives
Walter Fullwood (1907–1988), English cricketer

Fictional characters
 Lyn Fullwood, a character in the British soap opera Coronation Street

See also
 Fulwood (disambiguation)